The 1941 Chicago Cubs season was the 70th season of the Chicago Cubs franchise, the 66th in the National League and the 26th at Wrigley Field. The Cubs finished sixth in the National League with a record of 70–84.

Regular season

Season standings

Record vs. opponents

Notable transactions 
 September 2, 1941: Hank Gornicki was purchased by the Cubs from the St. Louis Cardinals.
 September 22, 1941: The purchase of Hank Gornicki's contract by the Cubs from the Cardinals was voided, and Gornicki was returned to the Cardinals.

Roster

Player stats

Batting

Starters by position 
Note: Pos = Position; G = Games played; AB = At bats; H = Hits; Avg. = Batting average; HR = Home runs; RBI = Runs batted in

Other batters 
Note: G = Games played; AB = At bats; H = Hits; Avg. = Batting average; HR = Home runs; RBI = Runs batted in

Pitching

Starting pitchers 
Note: G = Games pitched; IP = Innings pitched; W = Wins; L = Losses; ERA = Earned run average; SO = Strikeouts

Other pitchers 
Note: G = Games pitched; IP = Innings pitched; W = Wins; L = Losses; ERA = Earned run average; SO = Strikeouts

Relief pitchers 
Note: G = Games pitched; W = Wins; L = Losses; SV = Saves; ERA = Earned run average; SO = Strikeouts

Farm system

References

External links
1941 Chicago Cubs season at Baseball Reference

Chicago Cubs seasons
Chicago Cubs season
Chicago Cubs